The Women's National Basketball League (WNBL) is the pre-eminent professional women's basketball league in Australia. It is currently composed of eight teams. The league was founded in 1981 and is the women's counterpart to the National Basketball League (NBL). Several WNBL teams have NBL counterparts. The Adelaide Lightning, Melbourne Boomers, Perth Lynx, Southside Flyers and Sydney Uni Flames are the current WNBL teams sharing a market with an NBL team (the Townsville Fire and University of Canberra Capitals shared a market with the Townsville Crocodiles and Canberra Cannons respectively, before both NBL clubs became defunct). The current league champions are the Melbourne Boomers, who won their second title in 2022.

History

Founding of the WNBL 
In August 1980, West Adelaide Bearcat Coach Ted Powell, after an encouraging exchange of letters with St Kilda's Coach Bill Palmer, called a meeting at the Governor Hindmarsh Hotel in Adelaide. In attendance were Ted, North Adelaide Coach Kay McFarlane and Noarlunga Coach Brendan Flynn. At this meeting it was decided to approach three Victorian teams (St Kilda, CYMS and Nunawading) with the idea of forming a home and away Interstate Competition.

The six teams' delegates all met and confirmed the new League at the Town and Country Motel in Sydney during the 1980 Australian Club Championships.

The meeting resolved to form a two-round competition between these teams to be held in July and August in 1981. The basis for the idea was that many of the top sides in both States wanted a varied competition from their standard State League as well as a suitable preparation for the Australian Club Championship, which was held on an annual basis for the top 24 teams in the country.  There was also much excitement with the formation of the Men's National League in 1979 and the women felt that one of the best ways to develop the game was to provide more opportunities for the best players and clubs to play against each other more regularly.

A major consideration was finance and with this in mind the competition was formed with the six teams with a full home and away series between all teams with three games on one weekend to save costs. The NSW based clubs of Bankstown and Sutherland were not happy to be left out due to costs and offered to pay their own way to Melbourne and Adelaide where they would play each team once for double points.

And so the WNBL was born. Reference. (Boti Nagy. High flyers: women's basketball in Australia 1990. Sun Books)

In 1981, the Australian Institute of Sport (AIS) was also opened and the men's head coach Dr. Adrian Hurley (who was to lead the Australian Boomers in the 1988 and 1992 Olympics) contacted the clubs and asked whether the AIS could also participate in the competition to commence later that year.

The nine teams in the inaugural season of the league were: AIS, Bankstown Bruins, Catholic Young Men's Society (CYMS), Melbourne Telstars, Noarlunga Tigers, North Adelaide Rockets, St. Kilda Saints, Sutherland Sharks and West Adelaide Bearcats. The competition commenced on 19 June 1981 with the first game to be played in Adelaide between the AIS and West Adelaide. The competition was called the Women's Interstate Basketball Conference with each team paying the sum of $25 to be a part of the WIBC – giving a central fund of $200 to conduct the competition.

1981–1985: Early years
The inaugural winner was St. Kilda who defeated the North Adelaide Rockets 77–58. St. Kilda also went on to win the Victorian State Championship and the Australian Club Championship in Melbourne, defeating Bankstown Bruins in the final. St. Kilda had three Australian representatives in Tracy Morris, Karen Ogden and Patricia Cockrem. Ogden became the national league's first dual Most Valuable Player award winner when she took the individual trophy in 1982 (the first season it was presented) and again in 1983.

In 1982, the competition expanded into another state with the entry of a combined Brisbane team. The new revised program saw Victorian teams travelling to NSW and AIS, and NSW teams travelling to South Australia and South Australian teams travelling to Victoria. It was not a full home and away competition but the beginnings of what was to come in the future. The competition also changed its name to the more appropriate Women's Basketball League. St. Kilda repeated in 1982 with a grand final win over Bankstown – the men's team also won the first two NBL titles, which showed the strength of St. Kilda at that time.

In 1983, Nunawading Spectres led by Robyn Maher easily defeated St. Kilda and went on to win nine WNBL titles during the next 12 years. During the 1983 Australian Club Championships, a workshop was held to discuss women's basketball and from that meeting came the decision to bring together a second tier of clubs to form the Women's Conference. There were now 20 women's teams playing in a home and away competition, which immediately improved the standard of women's basketball in Australia.

With the NBL finally riding the crest of a sudden wave of popularity, media interest in the women's league also was on the increase. Most clubs were recognising the need to promote themselves and the image of the league. Double header matches with the men's NBL and with South East Basketball League games – a secondary men's interstate competition – pushed the women's game before a wider spectator audience unfamiliar with the quality of women's basketball. In 1985, the two competitions continued to work together to improve women's basketball and recognised the need to promote the competition and the individual clubs and athletes. Hobart was winners of the second conference and was keen to enter the main competition, however this was not to be until 1986.

1986–1989: League expansion and growth
When Perth admitted a team for the 1986 Women's Basketball Conference, the two women's leagues could rightfully claim that between them they had a truly national competition. The Australian Basketball Federation approved the WBL's application to be renamed the National Women's Basketball League and a new era was underway. 1986 was also the first year that the WNBL played its first full home and away competition and next year, Perth sought a position in the number league. Perth's inclusion was on the basis that they paid their own airfares in the first two years to earn their position.

Following the success of the Seoul Olympics, the WNBL was ready to enter a new era and appointed Lyn Palmer in the newly created full-time general manager position. Lyn Palmer, who had just retired after a distinguished playing career with St. Kilda, Nunawading and Coburg, was looking for a change whilst her husband Bill was general manager of the men's NBL.

In 1989, the WNBL gained its first sponsorship in Pony, one of Australia's leading sporting apparel companies at the time for $258,000 and ABC agreed to cover the finals series. The women's game in Australia was on the move – there were 13 teams in the WNBL for the 1989 season, with the Bankstown Bruins changing their name to the Sydney Bruins to try to gain more market exposure in Australia's largest city.

1990s: Continued growth
The next few years saw the league continue to grow with Australia being awarded the Women's World Championships in 1994. The pressure was now on to ensure that women's basketball gained a profile in the country, and in 1993, the WNBL teams agreed to contribute some money to enable the game to be televised on a weekly basis by ABC. This was the break through that the sport needed and also coincided with the Sydney Kings taking over the ownership of the Sydney Bruins and the formation of the Sydney Flames.

Coached by Carrie Graf, the Flames became one of Australia's most popular women's sporting teams. The Perth Breakers led the way with the bodysuit in the early 1990s whilst the Flames continued to modify the suit, winning the title in 1993 and gaining back page coverage on the Sydney newspapers, a feat never envisaged back in the early 1980s.

The 1990s were dominated by Sydney, Melbourne Tigers, Adelaide Lightning and Canberra. The AIS won their first title in the first summer season of 1998–99 led by one of the best basketballers in the world, Lauren Jackson.
Jan Morris continued as the President (10 years as President is recognised as an outstanding contribution to the WNBL) of the League and in 1995 Leeanne Grantham (née Christie) became the Chief Executive.  Throughout the mid-late 1990s (and into the early 2000s) the WNBL brand became the most well known women's sport brand in Australia, it was also recognised as one of the top 3 leading women's basketball leagues in the world.

The ABC televised weekly WNBL games and broadcast the 1994 Women's World Championships held in Australia, this provided women's basketball with the type of profile required to help secure significant sponsorship enabling the League to reduce the travel pool and to continue to build on the WNBL Brand.

2000s

The ABC continued to televise the league despite some difficulties in mid-2001 when the ABC contemplated changing their televising of sport. A successful partnership between the WNBL and Netball Australia subsequently saw both sports retained on ABC. ABC undertook to increase their coverage by showing Friday night games live on ABC digital television as well as a replay in the regular Saturday afternoon slot.

The WNBL was very stable with eight teams for a number of seasons with Tasmania and Northern Territory not represented. In 2006, Bendigo, through the efforts of a strong community focus for women's basketball, commenced discussions with Basketball Australia about entering a team for the 2007–08 season. At the same time, Basketball New Zealand had discussions with Basketball Australia about a team from New Zealand entering the next season.

In October 2006, the decision was made to welcome two new teams into the WNBL for the 2007–08 season in Bendigo Spirit and Christchurch Sirens. Bendigo brought excellent community support into the league, whilst Christchurch had a number of the New Zealand Tall Ferns on their roster to begin. One of the strategic objectives of the WNBL was to see a second team out of Queensland from the south and after some very effective feasibility work, Logan Basketball Association were successful in being admitted into the 2008–09 season with the Logan Thunder.

In 2013, the Adelaide Lightning merged into a partnership with the NBL's Adelaide 36ers which sees the two clubs sharing management and marketing departments, as well as use of the 8,000 seat Adelaide Arena, the largest venue currently used in the WNBL. The collaboration of WNBL and NBL teams from the same city is seen as a way of raising the public profile of both the WNBL and the Lightning, with several Lightning home games played before 36ers games in cross-promoted double headers ensuring the women's game often finishes in front of crowds in excess of 5,000.

Current clubs

Former clubs 
 Adelaide City Comets – 1992
 Australian Institute of Sport (AIS) – 1981 to 2011–12
 Brisbane Blazers – 1982 to 1998
 Catholic Young Men's Society (CYMS) – 1981 to 1982
 Christchurch Sirens – 2007–08 
 Coburg Cougars – 1983 to 1990
 Geelong Supercats – 1986
 Hobart Islanders – 1986 to 1996
 Logan Thunder – 2008–09 to 2013–14
 Melbourne Telstars – 1981
 Melbourne Tigers – 1989 to 2000–01
 Noarlunga Tigers – 1981 to 1991
 North Adelaide Rockets – 1981 to 1991
 Nunawading Spectres (Melbourne East Spectres) – 1982 to 1991
 South East Queensland Stars – 2015–16
 St. Kilda Saints – 1981 to 1985
 Sutherland Sharks – 1981 to 1986
 West Adelaide Bearcats – 1981 to 1992

Season format

Regular season
The WNBL regular season typically begins in early October and concludes in mid to late February. During the regular season, each team plays 24 games, 12 home and away. Each team plays each other at least three times, and some of the teams four times. The top four teams in on the Championship ladder move on to the WNBL Finals, usually taking place in March.

After April, teams hold training camps. Training camps allow the coaching staff to prepare the players for the regular season, and determine the roster with which they will begin the regular season. After training camp, a series of preseason exhibition games are held.

WNBL Finals 

The top four teams at the end of the regular season advances to the finals. The teams finishing in the first and second positions at the completion of the regular season receive home advantage in their three-game first-round match-up against the teams finishing in fourth and third positions respectively. The winners of these series advance to the grand final. With home advantage being awarded to the highest remaining seed, the winner of the three-game grand final series is crowned as WNBL champion.

|-
! style="width:4%;" rowspan="2"| Season
! style="width:16%;" colspan="2"| Champions
! style="width:16%;" colspan="2"| Runners-up
! style="width:5%;" rowspan="2"| Format
! style="width:3%;" rowspan="2"| Result
! style="width:8%;" rowspan="2"| Finals MVP
|-
! style="width:8%;"|Team
! style="width:8%;"|Coach
! style="width:8%;"|Team
! style="width:8%;"|Coach
|-
| 1981
| St Kilda Saints
| 
| North Adelaide Rockets
| Kay McFarlane
| Single game
| 77–58
| N/A
|-
| 1982
| St Kilda Saints
| 
| Bankstown Bruins
| Robbie Cadee
| Single game
| 63–56
| N/A
|-
| 1983
| Nunawading Spectres
| Tom Maher
| St Kilda Saints
| 
| Single game
| 70–46
| N/A
|-
| 1984
| Nunawading Spectres
| Tom Maher
| West Adelaide Bearcats
| Ted Powell
| Single game
| 78–65
| N/A
|-
| 1985
| Coburg Cougars
| 
| Noarlunga Tigers
| Jim Madigan
| Single game
| 73–71
| Karin Maar
|-
| 1986
| Nunawading Spectres
| 
|  Australian Institute of Sport  
| 
| Single game
| 62–51
| Shelley Gorman
|-
| 1987
| Nunawading Spectres
| Tom Maher
| Coburg Cougars
| 
| Single game
| 67–59
| Tracey Browning
|-
| 1988
| Nunawading Spectres
| Tom Maher
| North Adelaide Rockets
| Kay McFarlane
| Single game
| 71–43
| Shelley Gorman
|-
| 1989
| Nunawading Spectres
| Tom Maher
| Hobart Islanders
| 
| Single game
| 80–69
| Robyn Maher
|-

|-
! style="width:4%;" rowspan="2"| Season
! style="width:16%;" colspan="2"| Champions
! style="width:16%;" colspan="2"| Runners-up
! style="width:5%;" rowspan="2"| Format
! style="width:3%;" rowspan="2"| Result
! style="width:8%;" rowspan="2"| Finals MVP
|-
! style="width:8%;"|Team
! style="width:8%;"|Coach
! style="width:8%;"|Team
! style="width:8%;"|Coach
|-
| 1990
| North Adelaide Rockets
| Mark Molitor
| Hobart Islanders
| 
| Single game
| 72–57
| Donna Brown
|-
| 1991
| Hobart Islanders
| 
| Nunawading Spectres
| 
| Single game
| 67–64
| Debbie Black
|-
| 1992
| Perth Breakers
| Tom Maher
| Dandenong Rangers
| Alex Palazzolo
| Single game
| 58–54
| Tanya Fisher
|-
| 1993
| Sydney Flames
| Carrie Graf
| Perth Breakers
| Guy Molloy
| Single game
| 65–64
| Annie Burgess
|-
| 1994
| Adelaide Lightning
| Jan Stirling
| Melbourne Tigers
| Ray Tomlinson
| Single game
| 84–77
| Rachael Sporn
|-
| 1995
| Adelaide Lightning
| Jan Stirling
| Melbourne Tigers
| Ray Tomlinson
| Single game
| 50–43
| Rachael Sporn
|-
| 1996
| Adelaide Lightning
| Jan Stirling
| Sydney Flames
| Carrie Graf
| Single game
| 80–65
| Michelle Brogan
|-
| 1997
| Sydney Flames
| Bill Tomlinson
| Adelaide Lightning
| Jan Stirling
| Single game
| 61–56
| Trisha Fallon
|-
| 1998
| Adelaide Lightning
| Jan Stirling
| Sydney Flames
| Murray Wardle
| Single game
| 67–56
| Jo Hill
|-
| 1998–99
| Australian Institute of Sport
| Phil Brown
| Perth Breakers
| Murray Treseder
| Single game
| 88–79
| Kristen Veal
|-

|-
! style="width:4%;" rowspan="2"| Season
! style="width:16%;" colspan="2"| Champions
! style="width:16%;" colspan="2"| Runners-up
! style="width:5%;" rowspan="2"| Format
! style="width:3%;" rowspan="2"| Result
! style="width:8%;" rowspan="2"| Finals MVP
|-
! style="width:8%;"|Team
! style="width:8%;"|Coach
! style="width:8%;"|Team
! style="width:8%;"|Coach
|-
| 1999–00
| Canberra Capitals
| Carrie Graf
| Adelaide Lightning
| Jan Stirling
| Single game
| 67–50
| Kristen Veal
|-
| 2000–01
| Sydney Panthers
| Karen Dalton
| Canberra Capitals
| Carrie Graf
| Single game
| 67–50
| Annie Burgess
|-
| 2001–02
| Canberra Capitals
| Carrie Graf
| Sydney Flames
| Karen Dalton
| Single game
| 75–69
| Lauren Jackson
|-
| 2002–03
| Canberra Capitals
| Tom Maher
| Sydney Flames
| Karen Dalton
| Single game
| 69–67
| Lauren Jackson
|-
| 2003–04
| Dandenong Rangers
| Gary Fox
| Sydney Uni Flames
| Karen Dalton
| Single game
| 65–53
| Emily McInerny
|-
| 2004–05
| Dandenong Rangers
| Gary Fox
| Sydney Uni Flames
| Karen Dalton
| Single game
| 52–47
| Jacinta Hamilton
|-
| 2005–06
| Canberra Capitals
| Carrie Graf 
| Dandenong Rangers
| Gary Fox
| Single game
| 68–55
| Lauren Jackson
|-
| 2006–07
| Canberra Capitals
| Carrie Graf
| Sydney Uni Flames
| Karen Dalton
| Single game
| 73–59
| Tracey Beatty
|-
| 2007–08
| Adelaide Lightning
| Vicki Valk
| Sydney Uni Flames
| Karen Dalton
| Single game
| 92–82
| Renae Camino
|-
| 2008–09
| Canberra Capitals
| Carrie Graf
| Bulleen Boomers
| Cheryl Chambers
| Single game
| 61–58
| Natalie Hurst
|-

|-
! style="width:4%;" rowspan="2"| Season
! style="width:16%;" colspan="2"| Champions
! style="width:16%;" colspan="2"| Runners-up
! style="width:5%;" rowspan="2"| Format
! style="width:3%;" rowspan="2"| Result
! style="width:8%;" rowspan="2"| Finals MVP
|-
! style="width:8%;"|Team
! style="width:8%;"|Coach
! style="width:8%;"|Team
! style="width:8%;"|Coach
|-
| 2009–10
| Canberra Capitals
| Carrie Graf
| Bulleen Boomers
| Tom Maher
| Single game
| 75–70
| Lauren Jackson
|-
| 2010–11
| Bulleen Boomers
| Tom Maher
| Canberra Capitals
| Carrie Graf
| Single game
| 103–78
| Sharin Milner
|-
| 2011–12
| Dandenong Rangers
| Mark Wright
| Bulleen Boomers
| Tom Maher
| Single game
| 94–70
| Kathleen MacLeod
|-
| 2012–13
| Bendigo Spirit
| Bernie Harrower
| Townsville Fire
| Chris Lucas
| Single game
| 71–57
| Kelsey Griffin
|-
| 2013–14
| Bendigo Spirit
| Bernie Harrower
| Townsville Fire
| Chris Lucas
| Single game
| 94–83
| Kelsey Griffin
|-
| 2014–15
| Townsville Fire
| Chris Lucas
| Bendigo Spirit
| Bernie Harrower
| Single game
| 75–65
| Mia Newley
|-
| 2015–16
| Townsville Fire
| Chris Lucas
| Perth Lynx
| Andy Stewart
| Best-of-three
| 2–0
| Micaela Cocks
|-
| 2016–17
| Sydney Uni Flames
| Cheryl Chambers
| Dandenong Rangers
| Larissa Anderson
| Best-of-three
| 2–0
| Leilani Mitchell
|-
| 2017–18
| Townsville Fire
| Claudia Brassard
| Melbourne Boomers
| Guy Molloy
| Best-of-three
| 2–1
| Suzy Batkovic
|-
| 2018–19
| Canberra Capitals
| Paul Goriss 
| Adelaide Lightning
| Chris Lucas 
| Best-of-three
| 2–1
| Kelsey Griffin
|-

|-
! style="width:4%;" rowspan="2"| Season
! style="width:16%;" colspan="2"| Champions
! style="width:16%;" colspan="2"| Runners-up
! style="width:5%;" rowspan="2"| Format
! style="width:3%;" rowspan="2"| Result
! style="width:8%;" rowspan="2"| Finals MVP
|-
! style="width:8%;"|Team
! style="width:8%;"|Coach
! style="width:8%;"|Team
! style="width:8%;"|Coach
|-
| 2019–20
| Canberra Capitals
| Paul Goriss 
| Southside Flyers
| Cheryl Chambers
| Best-of-three
| 2–0
| Olivia Époupa
|-
| 2020
| Southside Flyers
| Cheryl Chambers 
| Townsville Fire
| Shannon Seebohm
| Single game
| 99–82
| Leilani Mitchell
|-
| 2021–22
| Melbourne Boomers
| Guy Molloy
| Perth Lynx
| Ryan Petrik
| Best-of-three
| 2–1
| Lindsay Allen
|-

Players and Coaches
Over the years the success of the Opals has been vitally linked to the success of the WNBL. The WNBL has seen the development of famous Opals such as Robyn Maher, Michele Timms, Karen Dalton, Rachael Sporn, Shelley Sandie, Julie Nykiel, Jenny Whittle, Lauren Jackson and Penny Taylor. All have represented Australia with distinction and been key performers season after season for their clubs.

Milestones

Awards

The Most Valuable Player Award is given to player deemed the most valuable for (her team) that season. The Grand Final Most Valuable Player Award is given to player deemed the most valuable for (her team) in the finals. The Rookie of the Year Award is awarded to the most outstanding first-year player. The Defensive Player of the Year Award is awarded to the league's best defender. The Top Shooter of the Year Award is given to the player who averages the most points at the conclusion of the regular season. The Coach of the Year Award is awarded to the coach that has made the most positive difference to a team. Also named are the All-Star Five, the most valuable and best performing players of each season.

Most recent award winners (2021–22)

International influence 

The WNBL has been a major stepping-stone for Australians to become noticed in European leagues and the WNBA in the United States. It has also attracted a number of players from English-speaking countries who supplement their WNBA salaries by playing in the league. This is possible because the WNBA conducts its season in the Northern Hemisphere summer, which is the off-season for most basketball leagues throughout the world, including the WNBL. A number of international players have played in the WNBL, such as:
  Chelsea Aubry, Canada – long time member & two-time champion with the Bendigo Spirit. 
  Alana Beard, United States – with the Canberra Capitals.
  Micaela Cocks, New Zealand – three-time champion with the Townsville Fire. 
  Shanavia Dowdell, United States – with the Townsville Fire.
  Olivia Époupa, France – one-time champion with the Canberra Capitals.
  Antonia Farnworth, United States – with the Perth Lynx.
  Ruth Hamblin, Canada – with the Perth Lynx & Adelaide Lightning.
  Laurie Koehn, United States – with the Melbourne Boomers.
  Betnijah Laney, United States – with the Perth Lynx, Bendigo Spirit & Dandenong Rangers.
  Jo Leedham, Great Britain – with the Bulleen Boomers. 
  Angela Marino, New Zealand – with the Canberra Capitals, Perth Lynx & Adelaide Lightning.
  Kia Nurse, Canada – first international MVP & two-time champion with the Canberra Capitals.
  Krista Phillips, Canada – one-time champion with the Dandenong Rangers. 
  Cappie Pondexter, United States – with the Dandenong Rangers.
  Qiu Chen, China – with the Canberra Capitals.
  Julie Vanloo, Belgium – with the Townsville Fire.

Television
ABC Television held the rights from the inaugural season in 1981 until they axed their coverage in the 2014/15 season.

Fox Sports picked up the rights for the 2017/18 season, after two seasons without television coverage. 
The 2020 season has returned to the screens of the ABC, along with Fox Sports and Kayo. 
ESPN picked up the rights for the 2022/23 season with 9Now streaming every remaining game.

See also

 Australian Basketball Association
 Basketball Australia
 Basketball in Australia
 National Basketball League
 State Basketball League
Timeline of women's basketball

References

External links 
 

 
Women's basketball leagues in Oceania
Basketball leagues in Australia
1981 establishments in Australia
Sports leagues established in 1981
Women's basketball competitions in Australia
Professional sports leagues in Australia